Swietenia macrophylla, commonly known as mahogany, Honduran mahogany, Honduras mahogany,  or big-leaf mahogany is a species of plant in the Meliaceae family. It is one of three species that yields genuine mahogany timber (Swietenia), the others being Swietenia mahagoni and Swietenia humilis. It is native to South America, Mexico and Central America, but naturalized in the Philippines, Singapore, Malaysia and Hawaii, and cultivated in plantations and wind-breaks elsewhere.

Description

Wood 
Mahogany wood is strong and is usually a source for furniture, musical instruments, ships, doors, coffins, decors.

Leaves 
Mahogany is characterised by its large leaves (up to 45 cm long). The leaflets are even in number and are connected by a central midrib.

Fruits 
The fruits are called "sky fruits" because of its upwards growth towards the sky. The fruits of mahogany can be measure to 40 cm in length, in a light grey to brown capsule. Each fruit capsule could contain 71 winged seeds.

Seeds 
The seeds of mahogany can reach 7 to 12 cm long.

Timber 

Unlike mahogany sourced from its native locations, plantation mahogany grown in Asia is not restricted in trade. The mahogany timber grown in these Asian plantations is the major source of international trade in genuine mahogany today. The Asian countries which grow the majority of Swietenia macrophylla are India, Indonesia, Malaysia, Bangladesh, Fiji, Philippines, Singapore, and some others, with India and Fiji being the major world suppliers. The tree is also planted in Laos PDR.

Medicinal use 

It was scientifically studied for its various biological activities.  A detailed mechanism of action of apoptotic inducing effect on HCT116 human cancer cell line was elucidated.  Through solvent extraction and fractionation done on seeds of Swietenia macrophylla, the ethyl acetate fraction (SMEAF) was further examined for its neuroprotective activity and acute toxicity effects.  Various purified compounds derived from Swietenia macrophylla were further examined and was revealed to possesses potent PPARγ binding activity which might capable of stimulating glucose uptake in muscle cells. 

The ethyl acetate fraction from the seeds of Swietenia macrophylla (SMEAF) was studied for anti-inflammatory properties using lipopolysaccharide (LPS)-induced BV-2 microglia. SMEAF significantly attenuated the LPS-induced production of nitric oxide (NO), inducible nitric oxide synthase (iNOS), cyclooxygenase-2 (COX-2), tumour necrosis factor-α (TNF-α) and interleukin-6 (IL-6). SMEAF inhibited nuclear translocation of nuclear factor-kappa B (NF-κB) via the attenuation of IκBα phosphorylation. Moreover, SMEAF markedly suppressed phosphorylation of Akt, p38 Mitogen-activated protein kinase (MAPK) and Extracellular signal-regulated kinase 1/2 (ERK1/2) in LPS-induced BV-2 cells. Treatment with specific inhibitors for Akt, NF-κB, p38 and ERK1/2 resulted in the attenuation of iNOS and COX-2 protein expression. These findings indicated that SMEAF possesses anti-inflammatory activities in BV-2 cells by modulating LPS-induced pro-inflammatory mediator production via the inhibition of Akt-dependent NF-κB, p38 MAPK and ERK1/2 activation. These results further advocate the potential use of S. macrophylla as nutraceutical for the intervention of neurodegenerative and neuroinflammatory disorders.

There are also claims of its ability to improve blood circulation and skin condition, as well as anti-erectile dysfunction.

However, there are reports of liver injury or hepatotoxicity after consumption of Mahogany Seeds both in raw form and raw seeds grind and pack in capsule form. The severity of liver damage varies. There are also the report of single case kidney injury and polyarthralgia. In most cases, the liver function was recovered after stopping the consumption. The exact mechanism of these adverse events is currently unknown.

These cases that happened are the first reports of Swietenia Macrophylla seeds’ association with liver injury. This may also due to over dosage and consumption of contaminated raw seeds which are never been thoroughly investigated. Based on acute oral toxicity studies of Swietenia Macrophylla seeds, the consumption of Swietenia Macrophylla by humans is safe if the dose is less than 325 mg/kg body weight. The usual dose of Swietenia Macrophylla prescribed in Malaysian folk-lore medicine is one seed per day.

Population genetics
Mesoamerican rainforest populations show higher structure than in the Amazon.

Common names
The species is also known under other common names, including bastard mahogany, broad-leaved mahogany, Brazilian mahogany, large-leaved mahogany, genuine mahogany, tropical American mahogany, and sky fruit, among others.
English - big leaf mahogany, large-leaved mahogany, Brazilian mahogany
French - 
Spanish - 
Malayalam - 
Tamil -  (தேன்கனி) 
Telugu - 
Sinhala -  (මහෝගනි)

References

External links 

macrophylla
Trees of Belize
Trees of Bolivia
Trees of Brazil
Trees of Campeche
Trees of Chiapas
Trees of Colombia
Trees of Costa Rica
Trees of Dominica
Trees of Ecuador
Trees of El Salvador
Trees of French Guiana
Trees of Guadeloupe
Trees of Guatemala
Trees of Guyana
Trees of Honduras
Trees of Martinique
Trees of Mexico
Trees of Nicaragua
Trees of Panama
Trees of Peru
Trees of Quintana Roo
Trees of Tabasco
Trees of Venezuela
Trees of Veracruz
Vulnerable plants
National symbols of Belize
Trees of the Philippines
Invasive plant species in Sri Lanka
Taxonomy articles created by Polbot